Leonard S. Riggio (born February 28, 1941) is a retired American businessman and entrepreneur.  He served as executive chairman of book store chain Barnes & Noble and was its largest shareholder from 1971 until the sale of the company to the hedge fund Elliott Advisors in 2019.  Under his leadership the company expanded significantly from a single retail location on 105 Fifth Avenue, New York to a nationwide chain with 600+ stores, which it did with acquisitions and mergers of competing chain stores.

Early life and education

Born in New York City, Riggio attended Brooklyn Technical High School, graduating in 1958, followed by evening classes at New York University. His father, Steve Riggio, was a professional boxer who twice defeated Rocky Graziano.

His brother, Steve Riggio, was CEO of the Barnes & Noble chain of bookstores until his replacement by William Lynch in 2010.

Career
While at New York University, Riggio founded the Student Book Exchange in 1965 and turned this small book store into a leading retailer. He acquired the Barnes & Noble bookstore in New York City in 1971 and adopted its name for his expanding company. He acquired hundreds of bookstores through the years and launched the Barnes & Noble superstore concept with an in-store coffee shop and spacious reading alcoves.

Riggio is recognized as being among the first entrepreneurs who turned the elitist world of bookstores into recreational stores. In 1997, Barnes & Noble had 483 superstores, 528 mall-based B. Daltons, and sales went up to $2.8 billion. The company went public in 1993.

Riggio launched barnesandnoble.com to compete with Amazon.com for online book sales and launched a successful video game retail operation, which grew to become GameStop. By the end of the 20th century, Riggio had built Barnes & Noble into the world's largest bookseller.

Since 1985 Riggio has been Chairman of the Board and 49% owner of MBS Textbook Exchange, Inc. based in Columbia, Missouri. MBS is one of the nation's largest wholesalers of college textbooks.

Awards
Riggio's awards include the Americanism Award from the Anti-Defamation League in November 2000. This award is the ADL's highest honor.

Thoroughbred racing
Through his nom de course My Meadowview Farm, Leonard Riggio bred and raced horses for Thoroughbred racing. Among his successes, his colt Samraat won the Damon Runyon, Gotham and Withers Stakes.

Philanthropy
Riggio is the benefactor of many community organizations and charities, including New York University and the Dia:Beacon art museum in Beacon, New York.

He also established Project Home Again to assist residents of New Orleans, Louisiana, who were affected by Hurricane Katrina in 2005.  Project Home Again will spend $20 million from the Riggio Foundation to build new homes in the Gentilly neighborhood of New Orleans.  The pilot phase involves building 20 new homes on St. Bernard Avenue. On November 10, 2011, the program cut the ribbon on its 101st home. In addition to rebuilding the homes, the Riggios, through a partnership with Rooms to Go, also furnished the homes.  On November 24, 2012, New Orleans Mayor Mitch Landrieu awarded the Riggios keys to the City of New Orleans at a City Council meeting.

References

Further reading 
 Trachtenberg, Jeffrey A., "What's Barnes & Noble's Survival Plan? Former CEO Cuts Holding to 20%, but Says, 'The Story Isn't Written Yet'", The Wall Street Journal, April 18, 2014

1941 births
20th-century American businesspeople
21st-century American businesspeople
American booksellers
American company founders
American chairpersons of corporations
American businesspeople in retailing
American racehorse owners and breeders
Philanthropists from New York (state)
Barnes & Noble
Businesspeople from New York City
Living people
American patrons of the arts
Patrons of schools
People from the Bronx
New York University Stern School of Business alumni
Brooklyn Technical High School alumni
People from Bensonhurst, Brooklyn